Bigelow Bridge (regionally known as Axe Handle Road Bridge) is one of six historic covered bridges in Union County, Ohio.

The wooden truss bridge was built in 1873 by Reuben Partridge, and named for Eliphas Bigelow, a nearby resident. It was refurbished including the addition of internal steel supports in 1990, and repainted in July 2008.

In November 2010, a historical marker was dedicated on the site by the Ohio Historical Society, honoring Bigelow Bridge and the surrounding Darby Plains region.

References

External links
Dale Travis Covered Bridge List - Bigelow Bridge

Bridges completed in 1873
Covered bridges in Ohio
Buildings and structures in Union County, Ohio
Wooden bridges in Ohio
Transportation in Union County, Ohio
Tourist attractions in Union County, Ohio
Road bridges in Ohio